Silver Run Peak is in the Beartooth Mountains in the U.S. state of Montana. The peak is one of the tallest in the Beartooth Mountains, the six tallest in Montana, and is located in the Absaroka-Beartooth Wilderness of Custer National Forest. Silver Run Peak is the high point of the expansive Silver Run Plateau, a high-altitude plateau in the eastern Beartooth Mountains.

References

Silver Run
Beartooth Mountains
Mountains of Carbon County, Montana